Myrmothera is a genus of birds belonging to the family Grallariidae. Established by French ornithologist Louis Jean Pierre Vieillot in 1816, it contains two or three species, depending on the taxonomy followed. The International Ornithological Congress (IOC) recognises three species:
 Thrush-like antpitta (Myrmothera campanisona)
 Tapajos antpitta (Myrmothera subcanescens)
 Tepui antpitta (Myrmothera simplex)
Some other taxonomies, including those followed by the Integrated Taxonomic Information System and Handbook of Birds of the World, consider the Tapajos antpitta to be a subspecies of the thrush-like antpitta. Based on DNA analysis, the genus is considered to be a sister taxon to the genus Hylopezus. The name Myrmothera is a compound word created from the Greek words murmos, meaning "ant" and -theras, meaning "hunter" (from therao, meaning "to hunt).

References

 
Bird genera
Taxa named by Louis Jean Pierre Vieillot
Taxonomy articles created by Polbot